Armstrong Elementary School is a historic elementary school for African-American students located at Lynchburg, Virginia. It opened in 1954, and consists of five sections: the two-story, 12-bay long, brick veneer classroom block; the shorter, rectangular-shaped cafetorium (combination cafeteria and auditorium) on the northeast end of the classroom block with a smaller kitchen wing; a large rectangular gymnasium on the rear; and the adjacent small boiler room.  It is in the Streamline Moderne style.  The property includes the site of the original school that was demolished in 1959.  It was built as an equalization school prior to the Brown v. Board of Education decision that struck down racial segregation in public schools.

It was listed on the National Register of Historic Places in 2012.

References

African-American history of Virginia
School buildings on the National Register of Historic Places in Virginia
School buildings completed in 1954
Streamline Moderne architecture in Virginia
Schools in Lynchburg, Virginia
National Register of Historic Places in Lynchburg, Virginia
1954 establishments in Virginia